Jascha Spivakovsky (18 August 1896 – 23 March 1970) was a Russian Empire-born Australian piano virtuoso of the 20th century. He was hailed as a child prodigy in Odessa but almost murdered by Imperial Guards during the 1905 Pogrom. He fled to Berlin and was declared the heir of Anton Rubinstein and likened to Ignacy Paderewski and Teresa Carreño before being imprisoned as an Imperial Russian enemy alien during World War I. In the interwar period he became internationally recognized as one of the greatest pianists in the world and regarded in Europe as the finest living interpreter of Brahms. He also formed a trio which toured Europe with phenomenal success and was declared the finest in the world. Towards the beginning of 1933 he was warned by Richard Strauss in a musically coded secret message that he had become a Nazi target due to his Jewish heritage. He fled to Australia a few days before the Nazi seizure of power and put his musical career on hold to help people escape the Third Reich. After World War II he returned to the stage and astounded the toughest of critics with the power, depth and maturity of his interpretations. Although his fame dimmed after he ceased touring because he had made no commercial (solo) studio recordings, his rediscovery was sparked in 2015 by the first releases of his live performances. These have caused considerable excitement among music lovers and prompted some experts to declare Spivakovsky one of the greatest pianists they have ever heard.

Musical biography

Early life
Jascha Spivakovsky was born in a small village near Kiev, Russian Empire into a 400-year-old line of musicians. He began playing the piano unprompted at three years of age: hearing a busker in the street below his family's apartment, he reproduced the melody on the family piano and added a flawless left hand accompaniment. He was taught by his father until the age of six when the family moved to Odessa so he could receive expert instruction. The following year he was discovered by Josef Hofmann who noted his "great lyricism and great technical potential" and helped arrange an audition with the imposing Director of the Moscow Conservatory, Vasily Safonov. Safonov offered his personal tuition at the Conservatory and provided a written endorsement which began: "I today listened to Jascha Spivakovsky play and found in this child a rare, outstanding talent." However, restrictions on Jewish people entering Moscow would have prevented his family accompanying him and at seven years of age the boy was too young to take up this opportunity alone.

Instead he started giving concerts in Odessa and was widely celebrated as a child prodigy, despite a few locals whispering that his astonishing musical gifts must be the product of witchcraft. After one sold-out concert he was presented with a grand piano by the wife of the Governor of Odessa. The following year he was almost murdered when a racist mob massacred the Odessa Jewish community in the 1905 Pogrom. When this mob stormed their apartment block and murdered the ground-floor tenant, the Spivakovsky family climbed onto the roof where they could see Cossack Imperial Guards approaching on horseback. Instead of quelling the violence, the guards opened fire on them and a desperate shove from his sister saved Spivakovsky by a split-second from a bullet aimed at his head. The family tumbled down a fire escape and hid under straw in the basement of their Polish Catholic landlord for five days. When they emerged they found all their belongings had been looted and the grand piano thrown from their fifth-floor balcony and smashed to pieces.

Spivakovsky gave concerts to support the now penniless family and save money for them to move to a safer country. In 1906 he played again for Hofmann who noted in particular the "remarkable ability of this young pianist in the use of pedal." The following year he played to a packed house at the Odessa City Theatre and Odessa News Section published the following review: "The audience immediately felt the presence of talent and succumbed to the instinctive mood of the child. This was the nine year old pianist Jascha Spivakovsky, about whom so much has been said in Odessa. It is silly to argue. Of course this is talent. Huge talent, outstanding and until now uncanny and innate. That which is now appearing in him seems extraordinary and incomprehensible at such an age – yet it is his own and innate. The technique is innate as is the musical interpretation. The phrasing is also his own and inborn, purely instinctive. And everywhere ... is the fascinating and audience-capturing ability to make every work alive and give it a sense of spirituality. It appears this is the distinctive phenomenon of Jascha Spivakovsky's talent."

He was awarded pupillage at the Klindworth-Scharwenka Conservatory in Berlin, where the faculty included direct students of Franz Liszt and Anton Rubinstein, such as Karl Klindworth and Alberto Jonás. Spivakovsky's development there was overseen by the renowned pedagogue, pianist and ensemble performer Professor Moritz Mayer-Mahr, who later authored the tome Technique of Pianoforte Playing with the official endorsement of Artur Nikisch, Eugen d'Albert, Ferruccio Busoni, Otto Neitzel, Moriz Rosenthal, and Emil von Sauer. Mayer-Mahr declared Spivakovsky "without doubt one of the great talents of our time" and the Conservatory Director, composer and conductor Robert Robitschek (who had studied with Antonín Dvořák) echoed: "in my experience there have been no similar cases of such meaningful musical intellect and rhythmical gifts." At age ten Spivakovsky began giving concerts in Berlin and a prominent critic noted: "The public liked best of all Jascha Spivakovsky of Odessa, who had just reached school age. He demonstrated such musical understanding and such technical potential that it would be impossible not to look forward with great interest to his future development." At age thirteen he outclassed an adult field and was awarded the Blüthner Prize. The final-round judges Ferruccio Busoni, Ossip Gabrilowitsch and Leopold Godowsky were seated behind a screen where the competitors performed to prevent any bias on account of Spivakovsky's youth.

Mayer-Mahr now determined that Spivakovsky was now ready to debut as a professional and selected Leipzig as the location, due to its reputation for the toughest critics in Europe. Spivakovsky astounded these critics and was hailed as "The New Anton Rubinstein." The Leipziger Zeitung reported: "With his verve he reminds one of Anton Rubinstein, and with his pithiness of expression of Bulow. He then proceeded to tour Europe and performed with leading conductors including Willem Mengelberg. The Berliner Lokal-Anzeiger predicted: "Jascha Spiwakowsky is called to great things," the Hamburger Correspondent declared: "The strongest talent I have encountered in the past decade" and the Breslauer Morgen-Zeitung wondered: "Who will explain this wonder-genius?" He also played for the royal families of Germany, Romania, Denmark, Bulgaria, Serbia and Montenegro and performed a recital in Odessa during a fearsome blizzard. Years later Vladimir Horowitz recounted how this recital inspired him: "Back in Russia when I was four years old, my mother dragged me through snowdrifts twenty feet deep to hear an outstanding prodigy. You were that prodigy." By age fifteen Spivakovsky was renowned as one of the top young pianists in Europe, with an uncommonly deep appreciation of the Romantics.

In 1913 he made his London debut at Bechstein Hall and was pronounced "King of the Keyboard" and "reminiscent of Paderewski and Carreno." His fame spread to the farthest reaches of the British Empire, New Zealand's The Horowhenua Daily Chronicle reporting: "A new pianist has been discovered. His name is Jascha Spiwakowski and he comes from the same district in Russia as Mischa Elman. He is only 17 years old, but has played in London and been acclaimed as a prodigy whose temperament and technical accomplishments are reminiscent of Carreño and Paderewski." He was engaged to return to London for concerts at the Queen's Hall and the Royal Albert Hall and a royal performance for Queen Alexandra, but his career froze when World War I broke out and he was imprisoned as a Russian enemy alien in Ruhleben internment camp. All the Klindworth-Scharwenka Professors petitioned for his release and eventually he was paroled on the orders of Kaiser Wilhelm II. He remained under strict military supervision but was allowed to resume performing towards the end of the war.

In late 1918 he commenced an epic series of concerts with the Berlin Philharmonic Orchestra illustrating the historical development of the concerto from Bach to Brahms. This tour de force was a massive success and stamped his reputation as a leading exponent of the great composers. The Berliner Tageblatt reported: "Outstanding among soloists is Jascha Spiwakowski, who at his second concert played the three Beethoven concertos. His excellent performance of these last three concertos places him in the ranks of our best pianists." He was engaged for another 40 concerts across Germany and sought by Europe's leading conductors, including Wilhelm Furtwängler for a performance of the Tchaikovsky Piano Concerto No. 1 with the Berlin Philharmonic Orchestra in Darmstadt. He then toured Europe with his twelve-year-old brother Tossy, who had debuted as a violin prodigy in Berlin a few years earlier. They were greatly celebrated everywhere and received "rather overwhelming" attention from the public in the streets of Copenhagen after performing for the Danish royal family. Dutch critics declared Tossy "The Young Joachim" and Scandinavian critics declared him without equal. He was soon appointed the youngest-ever concertmaster of the Berlin Philharmonic Orchestra by Furtwängler. The brothers went on to perform as a duo for many years and recorded for Parlophone, becoming renowned for artistic virtuosity, warm expression and perfect unison. One of their chief admirers was the great scientist and amateur violinist Albert Einstein.

1920s
In 1920 Spivakovsky returned to Britain and was hailed as "one of the greatest pianists in the world" and "the pianistic genius of the hour." One prominent London critic declared: "Of all the pianists I have heard in recent years, no one seems to have more temperamental affinity with the very greatest than Jascha Spivakovsky. There is in his art something personal and exclusive, rare and imaginative, that cannot be defined in English, liberal as it is in words of fine meaning. I can only sit back after hearing him and badly express my appreciation by calling him a genius." He also became famous for his "thrilling personality:" his season at Royal Albert Hall was "the sensation of London" with reports of "wild enthusiasm" from the audience and a crowd of 3000 clamouring outside his sold-out final concert. From The Lady: "Brailowsky, Gabrilowitsch, Fanny Davies, Moiseiwitsch and Spivakovsky all gave recitals last week. Spivakovsky's recital I enjoyed more than any. Since Carreño I have heard no one play with such overwhelming passion." And The Dover Express: "… played not only with supreme mastery of the instrument and brilliant technique, but with that rarer quality to be described only as soul ... much as I want to hear Cortot, I want to hear Spivakovsky again still more."

The British critics recognised him in particular as an exceptional exponent of Brahms. From The Evening Standard: "Seldom is the poetry of Brahms' music realised and expressed so fully as it was in Mr. Spiwakowsky's rendering of the Sonata in F minor." The Daily Telegraph: "He played the Brahms as though he adored every note of it, and the result was thoroughly convincing." And Musical News: "... independent thought expressed and impressed with masterly executive skill. Mr. Spiwakowsky will always be welcomed in London." He remained there until 1921, when he performed a series of concerts with Sir Henry Wood and the New Queen's Hall Orchestra including his first appearance at the Proms.

In 1922 he made his first tour of Australia and sparked scenes as wild as those seen in London: entire audiences rushed the stage, stormed backstage, chased him through the stage door and surrounded his motor car. From The Daily Telegraph: "One of the foremost pianists of the age." The Daily Mail: "It is no exaggeration to apply the appellation great to Jascha Spivakovsky ... His technique is superb, but one becomes oblivious to the purely mechanical perfection of his art in the delightful nuances of tone and colour of his playing, and the naturalness of expression in his interpretation." And Table Talk: "Jascha Spivakovsky, young as he is, ranks above any of the pianists we have heard in recent years and is probably the most satisfying, all-round performer this generation has heard. His interpretations have soul, that greatest asset, and a glorious mellow beauty of song-like tone which is enthralling." He was presented with a laurel wreath by Dame Nellie Melba who declared him "one of the greatest pianists in the world" and he gave the first radio broadcast of a live concert to the Australian public. His tour was much extended until he had given 75 concerts over seven months. At his farewell concert the audience insisted on a record 11 encores.

He then proceeded to New Zealand where his performances were acclaimed as the greatest heard by that generation and he was ranked at the level of Paderewski, Carreno, Mark Hambourg and Sir Charles Hallé. From The Dominion: "Recalling as faithfully as one may the memory of most of the great pianists who have passed this way during the last generation, it does not seem that this young Russian has ever been surpassed or even equalled." The New Zealand Times: "He is an inspired genius of the highest rank, and his shall be the undying fame, the memory of which shall be whispered in the world long after he shall have passed on." And The Evening Post: "It is simple literal truth to describe him as a great player, a veritable big man at the pianoforte … in the front rank of the greatest of pianoforte players." As in Britain and Australia, his playing aroused scenes of wild enthusiasm.

In 1923-24 he appeared again twice at the Proms with Sir Henry Wood and toured across Britain. From The Daily Telegraph: "His playing is never dull or academic; it is, in fact, tremendously alive and full of energy. Even in his most exuberant moments it is impossible not to admire the élan and strong rhythmic impulse of his performance." The Bath Herald: "His mastery of the instrument, his technique and his execution were wonderful; there seemed nothing he could not do, no music too difficult for him to master with complete ease." And the Western Daily Press: "... his technical skills, deep musicianship, maturity of intellect and vast repertoire have aroused astonishment everywhere."

Returning to the Continent he underscored his reputation as a supreme exponent of all styles. From Allgemeine Musikzeitung: "An expansive program placing extraordinary physical and mental demands on the resilience of the pianist, ranging from Bach and Beethoven through Chopin and Liszt to Debussy, Reger and Palmgren … established that this unusually gifted piano virtuoso, whose beginnings already drew all attention to him, is on a continually upwards trajectory with both technical as well as spiritual-musical development." Tägliche Rundschau: "Monumental greatness." The Berliner Borsen-Courier: "... a sure-handed creator on a grand scale." He was recognised in particular as unsurpassable in Brahms. From Berliner Vossische Zeitung: "Jascha Spiwakowsky has the peculiar art of placing the work outside himself, without, however, losing the least personal connection with it. His great pianistic ability, his uncommonly sure instinct for the tonal and psychic carrying capacity of the sound make him an exceptional artist. Brahms' F Minor Sonata found under his fingers an enlivenment which charmed through and through – cohesive, full of inner meaning and, in the lyrical episodes, wonderfully intimate." And Aftenposten in Oslo: "musical perception and technique of the highest perfection ... Not many could make this difficult work [the Brahms Sonata in f] sound as perfect as we heard it last night. With energy of steel he explored the passionate passages and with intimate delicacy played the quiet poetry. It was a masterly, unsurpassable performance." An awestruck Artur Rubinstein greeted him backstage after one performance with: "Your Brahms ... your Brahms!!!"

In 1926 he eloped to Bodenbach with Leonore Krantz, an Australian girl he had met during his tour there in 1922. Their honeymoon on the French Riviera was cut short when a message from Richard Strauss arrived, requesting that Spivakovsky perform his Burleske under his baton with the Vienna Philharmonic Orchestra in just a few weeks' time. With Leonore's blessing, Spivakovsky worked day and night to master the work and the performance was a stellar success. The Neues Wiener Journal reported: "Jascha Spivakovsky played the piano part in the Burleske unusually beautifully and full of life. Until now the piano music in this burlesque has been performed rather robustly, in a fortissimo-frenzy. The young Russian Spivakovsky, however, let the elegance, transparent beauty and clever wit of the piano-voice emerge. With economy of fortissimo and such fineness in the run-playing and figurework, the architectural beauty of this piece was discovered for the first time." After the concert Pauline Strauss rushed backstage and exclaimed to Spivakovsky: "You play like the devil himself!" She then pointed at his new bride and told her: "You take good care of him!"

He remained in Vienna and gave a series of hugely successful recitals. From Neues Weiner Journal: "Here is a true pianist who gives himself with ecstatic love to the sound-colour poetry of the piano, who is able to grasp the fine and the finest moods and to present them with exhaustive valour." And Weiner Allgemeine Zeitung: "A pianist whose technique commands the Liszt school as well as the modern. A dreamer and a stormer at the same time." He was engaged by Hans Knappertsbusch to perform Tchaikovsky's Piano Concerto No. 1 and Nueue Freie Presse reported: "Spiwakowsky showed himself a pianist of great style. One noticed the hot breath of temperament, the rushing wing-beat of talent." They proceeded to perform the work in Munich where the Munchener Zeitung declared: "... technical and musical finish such as I have never before encountered in this concerto. Our German pianists play such things too tamely in a Western fashion; but this Russian has the courage for the most extreme, he has the most fiery tempi, the most vigorous accents, the most tender and burning colours at his touch, the wildest limitlessness of crescendi, and yet always remaining – and this is the wonderful part if it – artistically restrained and fine." And in Magdeburg where Magdeburger Generalanzeiger raved: "With the same ardour, the quite Asiatic wildness with which Issay Dobrowen possibly directed the Pathetique of Tchaikovsky, Spiwakowsky commanded the B flat minor work. Sovereign of technique, musician by blood. Enveloping himself in sound. Storming away with fiery vigour and suddenly holding back, affected and affecting. Compelling natural grandeur."

He proceeded to tour Italy and Spain and sparked more scenes of wild enthusiasm. For instance in Salerno the entire audience cheered him through the streets from the Opera House to his hotel and would not leave until he gave a final curtain call from the balcony. From Gazetta di Venezia: "His crystal-clear and flowingly beautiful technique, melodiousness of velvet-like touch, and wisdom in the use of the pedals, led to wonderful effects of tone ... the level of enthusiasm of the public was unprecedented." La Sera: "He understands how to carry the public away with him in real enthusiasm. We have had few opportunities to register similar impulsive admiration." And El Castellano: "... the public's enthusiasm actually took them to the very doors of the Coliseum as a sincere tribute of farewell to the artist who had been able so well to win them over and overcome them ... already at the age of seven years he was a prodigy who caused a real sensation, and at the age of fourteen years, the press declared him 'The new Anton Rubinstein' and 'a pianist who always connects with the public.' I do not need to add any qualification more or other phrase to these lines which I am quoting. They afford a concise but a very true reflection of the merit of the artist to whom we were lucky enough to listen."

In 1928 he performed with Furtwangler and Strauss at the Schubert Centennial celebrations in Vienna. In the audience was George Kehler, who many years later wrote in his tome The Piano in Concert: "Characterised by the attributes of the Russian School – a remarkably rich and full tone quality (which cannot be adequately described) together with a very strong, consistent rhythmic impulse and an almost incredible legato. The legato enabled him to highlight the melodic line without pedalling, giving great unity to the overall concept without losing the fine detail. The sparing use of sustaining pedal gave great clarity of texture, which critics referred to as crystal piano-playing, an effective blending of the best of the old and new schools. Other critics who witnessed Spivakovsky's performances thought him to be an extraordinary artist, a musician of the masterly order, of great physical and intellectual power, an unsurpassable performer."

In 1929 Spivakovsky boarded a steamer bound for Australia and (perhaps due to his performances at the Schubert Centennial) Australian newspapers heralded that he was now "recognised in Europe as the finest living interpreter of Brahms." His Australian tour was massively successful and cemented his reputation as a master exponent of all the great composers. From The Sydney Mail: "No pianist who has ever appeared in Sydney before has played so many pieces without a single repetition ... Viewed from every aspect, Spivakovsky is one of the greatest and most versatile pianists who have visited Australia." The Register: "With a technique which makes difficulties negligible, the Russian pianist has intuition and dramatic feeling, and command of varied tones. He seems to call up the spirit of each composer in turn." And The Sunday Times: "One of the foremost figures in the world of music."

1930s
In 1930 the Spivakovsky Trio was born when the brothers were joined by Edmund Kurtz, the personal cellist of Russian prima ballerina Anna Pavlova who had studied with Pablo Casals. After five months of practising up to 14 hours a day together, Spivakovsky determined they were ready to give their debut and chose The Hague due to its reputation for the most difficult to impress audiences in Europe. Their debut was a stunning success and Algemeen Handelsblad reported: "Debut extraordinary – of all the concerts that I have ever heard this was one of the most beautiful. Their solo as well as their ensemble playing is the most perfect that one can imagine". They then toured Europe and were declared "the best chamber music combination of its kind," "the finest ensemble we have ever heard" and "above the highest praise."

Upon their return to Berlin, Spivakovsky learned that his leading reputation for interpreting Brahms and other German composers had infuriated the Nazis, who began attacking him in their press. When they began disrupting his concerts, he was warned to flee Germany by Richard Strauss in a musically coded message (a few bars of the William Tell Overture, which signify an impending storm, followed by an exclamation mark). He hurriedly arranged an Australasian tour of 70 concerts for the Trio and they boarded ship a few days before the Nazi seizure of power in 1933. Their tour was a phenomenal success and they were proclaimed "the finest trio of instrumentalists in the world," "supreme in the musical world today" and "one of those vivid experiences that remain fresh in one's memory through a musical lifetime." Critics also remarked with surprise on the pianist's exceedingly rare ability to perform solo, duo and trio works to the highest standard.

Sought by the leading Australian music institutions, the trio became faculty at the University of Melbourne and thereby avoided having to return to Germany at the end of their tour. However, for the next five years they were at constant threat of the notorious Dictation Test used by Australian immigration officers to arbitrarily deport Jewish people and others they deemed racially undesirable. To tour outside Australia would risk being disallowed return and they were increasingly blocked from the international stage by anti-Jewish movements, forced to cancel their 1934 tour of Italy. They were also receiving more and more pleas for help from people desperate to escape Germany, written in euphemisms in order to evade the Nazi censors. Spivakovsky put his touring career on hold and worked tirelessly to convince Great Depression-ravaged employers in Australia and elsewhere to sponsor visas for these people. Although he had made test pressings of solo performances for Parlophone before leaving Europe, he had not yet released solo performances to the public and hence he vanished from international musical circles.

Back in Germany Hitler placed all musical activities under the control of Joseph Goebbels, Minister of Public Enlightenment and Propaganda. In 1933 Goebbels began implementing policies to destroy and erase from memory the careers of Jewish musicians while fostering the careers of Nazi-approved artists. In 1938 his Ministry publicly announced that Spivakovsky and other leading Jewish musicians had been successfully erased from German culture. That same year Spivakovsky became a proud Australian citizen and British subject. During World War II, he gave concerts for allied troops, patriotic funds and charities and served as a volunteer Air Raid Warden. At the end of the war, he was devastated to learn of the death of his younger brother Albert, who had also been a prominent musician in Berlin. After fleeing the Nazis and dodging machine gun fire while carrying his wife through deep snow across the Swiss border, Albert had finally reached safety but succumbed to exposure.

Postwar
After the war Spivakovsky returned to his musical career with great seriousness of purpose and astounded even the toughest critics. Neville Cardus sent him a letter in 1945: "... I'd like to put into writing my gratitude for your most moving interpretation of Op.111. It was far more than an experienced piece of piano-playing. You entered into the sublime world of the work with an intent, unselfconscious eloquence which brought me close to tears." The same year his wife Lady Edith sent Spivakovsky a telegram after he performed the Piano Concerto No. 23 at the Melbourne Mozart Festival: "Hearty congratulations on the best Mozart have ever heard." In 1947 Sir Neville reviewed for the Sydney Morning Herald the season of Australian recitals which opened Spivakovsky's first postwar world tour. After the first recital he wrote: "Few pianists today would dare to approach the colossal Max Reger and his Fourteen Variations and Double Fugue on a Theme of Bach … extraordinary grip of technique and a far-reaching sense of conception and direction … this was playing which made much that has been heard on the instrument in Sydney these several years seem as the tinkling of insignificant bells." During the season: "It has been a rare experience. I knew Jascha Spivakovsky was a splendid pianist, of course; but I didn’t know he could so take the measure of some of the greatest works in piano literature." After the final recital, which featured four Beethoven sonatas: "Last night’s concert at the Town Hall would be belittled if it were described merely as a piano recital. It was an experience of mind and spirit and a sincere artist’s submergence of self and technical awareness into the world of Beethoven." The leading Australian critic John Sinclair echoed: "From whatever angle one viewed the performance it was stamped with unmistakeable signs of rarity and greatness ... I have never seen an artist sit at the keyboard with less apparent concern for its existence other than as a medium for the realisation of a long-matured imaginative conception. So inflexible is Spivakovsky’s mental control that not a bravura passage in all the four sonatas escaped its relationship to the interpretive whole ... I have the choice between futile and inadequate language and silence. The overtones are still too powerful in my ears to allow of objective comment."

Spivakovsky's touring then followed the winter concert season around the world non-stop for the next 14 years, broadening his reach to the United States, Great Britain, Europe, Canada, Australasia, Israel, India, Singapore and parts of Africa. In the United States he was hailed as a remarkable tonalist after performing at Carnegie Hall in 1948 where he was visited backstage by Vladimir Horowitz, Claudio Arrau, Simon Barere, Alexander Kipnis, George Szell, Erika Morini and the Budapest String Quartet. He was sought by conductor Pierre Monteux to perform a Brahms concerto due to his leading reputation for Brahms and after five years of clashing tour schedules, they eventually performed the Piano Concerto no. 2 during Monteux's final season with the San Francisco Symphony Orchestra in 1952. The San Francisco News reported: "Mastery of classic models plus individual dynamic freedom – a blending of the best from the old school of piano playing and the new. Beauty of tone and variety of colour and dynamics, together with Spivakovsky’s fine sculptural sense and appreciation of climactic values resulted in a beautiful projection of the musical score. Spivakovsky’s performance bespoke intellectuality as well as musicality." In Great Britain, he gave one of the first classical music performances on television in 1952 and his concert performance of Tchaikovsky's Piano Concerto No. 1 with the Hallé Orchestra was selected for broadcast by the BBC during the Coronation of Queen Elizabeth II celebrations in 1953. In Australia he was "massively brilliant" in Britten's Piano Concerto at a State Concert celebrating the coronation and gave premieres of modern works including Bloch's monumental Concerto Symphonique in the world's first recorded performance of this work.

By the time he retired from touring for health reasons in 1960, Spivakovsky had performed with nearly every great conductor of his era including Arthur Nikisch, Leo Blech, Issay Dobrowen, Willem Mengelberg, Felix Weingartner, Georg Schnéevoigt, Wilhelm Furtwängler, Hans Knappertsbusch, Richard Strauss, Sir Henry Wood, Sir Thomas Beecham, Efrem Kurtz, Sir Adrian Boult, Sir Malcolm Sargent, George Szell, Maurice Abravanel, Sir Eugene Goossens, Josef Krips, Pierre Monteux, Paul Kletzki and Leonard Bernstein. He had also been broadcast on radio and television stations around the world. He continued to teach as a professor at the Melbourne Conservatorium of Music and mentor younger pianists including William Kapell, Julius Katchen and Shura Cherkassky. He also continued to lead the Australian Friends of the Israel Philharmonic Orchestra, which he had founded in the 1930s at the personal request of his friend Bronislaw Huberman. He raised the funds for their first tour of Australia and suggested they engage the young conductor Zubin Mehta. A cultural beacon for international stars visiting Australia from 1933 onwards, he welcomed many friends and colleagues to his stately home Edzell House in Melbourne including Artur Schnabel, Bronisław Huberman, Mischa Elman, Benno Moiseiwitsch, Amelita Galli-Curci, George Szell, Arthur Rubinstein, Victor Borge, Ignaz Friedman, Claudio Arrau, Mindru Katz, Simon Barere, Walter Susskind, William Kapell, Rudolf Firkušný, Gary Graffman, Shura Cherkassky, Julius Katchen, Leonid Hambro, Ruggiero Ricci, Henryk Szeryng, Alexander Kipnis, Mieczyslaw Munz, Vlado Perlemuter, Alceo Galliera, Jascha Horenstein, David Oistrakh, Sylvia Fisher, Maureen Forrester, Isaac Stern, Daniel Barenboim, the Borodin Quartet, the Budapest String Quartet and the Israel Philharmonic Orchestra.

He died at his Melbourne home on 23 March 1970. Leonard Bernstein and others came to Edzell House to pay their respects after Spivakovsky died.

Rediscovery

Despite offers to make commercial recordings on Duo-Art, 78 rpm and LP record formats, Spivakovsky never made solo recordings in the studio. In the absence of a commercial discography, his fame dimmed after he ceased touring in 1960. However, in 2015 Pristine Audio began issuing a collection of his live recordings under the title Jascha Spivakovsky: Bach to Bloch. This sparked considerable excitement with critics and music lovers around the world. Damian Thompson of The Spectator heralded after hearing the first release: "He may well be one of the greatest pianists I have ever heard" and declared after hearing the second release: "This is an outstanding release, entirely confirming my view that Jascha Spivakovsky was one of the greatest pianists of all time ... I have no hesitation in putting Spivakovsky in the very top tier of pianists, along with Schnabel, Cortot, Richter, Solomon, Kempff, and maybe one or two pianists of today (Sokolov, Argerich, Kovacevich, the now-retired Brendel)."

Mark Ainley of The Piano Files echoed: "... while always playing idiomatically for each composer, there are qualities in Spivakovsky’s pianism that are consistently noticeable: an incredibly refined sonority ... phrasing that is masterfully shaped by fusing dynamics, tonal colour, and timing; a rubato that breathes and defies bar lines but serves the architectural structure of the music without the rhythmic pulse ever being lost; voicing that is consistent to the highest degree (the only pianist I’ve heard able to voice with such exquisite and consistent clarity is Lipatti); unbelievably subtle mastery of the pedal; and incredible digital dexterity ... He is, quite simply, one of the greatest pianists I have ever heard." Colin Clarke wrote in Fanfare: "... awe-inspiring ... simply stunning ... real magic and golden tone ... fingers of steel" and Gary Lemco declared in Audiophile Audition: "Whether Aeolian harp or thundering Horseman of the Apocalypse, the music finds Spivakovsky in splendid control of his arsenal of keyboard effects, a master of his palette." James Irsay dedicated programs on New York radio station WBAI to the release of each volume and declared: "A thinking pianist who sounds utterly spontaneous ... if that’s not the definition of real mastery, I don’t know what is!"

The fifth volume of live performances is scheduled for release this year and will include two of Spivakovsky's favourite concerti. A dedicated artist website www.jascha.com was established to coincide with the release of the first volume. This won a W3 Award for design excellence from the Academy of Interactive and Visual Arts in 2015.

References

External links
www.jascha.com
"Jascha Spivakovsky: The great lost pianist we can finally hear" by Damian Thompson, The Spectator, 22 August 2015
"Jascha Spivakovsky's recordings released 45 years after death" by Matthew Westwood, The Australian, 5 September 2015
The Greatest Pianist You've Never Heard Of by Mark Ainley, The Piano Files, 16 October 2015
Jascha Spivakovsky: Bach to Bloch – Volume I at Pristine Classical
Jascha Spivakovsky: Bach to Bloch – Volume II at Pristine Classical
Sound files of recently discovered recordings

1896 births
1970 deaths
Pupils of Artur Schnabel
Ukrainian pianists
20th-century classical pianists
Australian classical pianists
Male classical pianists
Jewish classical pianists
Classical piano duos
Musical trios
Jews from the Russian Empire
Soviet emigrants to Australia
20th-century Australian male musicians
20th-century Australian musicians